Huang Lei (born 10 March 1986) is a Chinese former professional tennis player.

Huang, while a student in Guangdong, represented China at the 2005 Summer Universiade, held in the Turkish city of İzmir.

On the professional tour, Huang reached a best singles ranking of 382 and won an ITF tournament in Tarakan in 2006. 

Her WTA Tour main-draw appearances all came in doubles and included a quarterfinal appearance at the 2006 Guangzhou International Women's Open. 

In 2007 she won two ITF doubles titles, one a $25,000 and the other a $50,000 tournament.

ITF Circuit finals

Singles: 2 (1–1)

Doubles: 5 (2–3)

References

External links
 
 

1986 births
Living people
Chinese female tennis players
21st-century Chinese women